The Lančiūnava-Šventybrastis Forest is a forest in Kėdainiai District Municipality, central Lithuania, located  north east to Kėdainiai, around Lančiūnava and Šventybrastis villages. It consists of smaller forests: the Lančiūnava Forest, the Lepšynė Forest, the Pavermenys Forest, the Šventybrastis Forest, the Apytalaukis Forest, the Stebuliai Forest. The forest belongs to the Nevėžis basin. The main rivers, draining the forest, are the Malčius, the Alkupis, the Suleva, the Šumera. Rivers' courses are mostly channelized. The relief is flat, marshy in places.

As of 2005, 43 % of the area was covered by birch, 7 % by spruce, 17 % by aspen, 12 % by ash, 4 % by oak, 9 % by black alder, 8 % by white alder tree groups. The fauna of the forest consists of wild boar, roe deer, moose, red fox, raccoon dog, gray wolf, pine marten, badger, hare, squirrel, beaver, also there are cranes, grey-headed woodpeckers, white-backed woodpeckers, middle spotted woodpeckers, corn crakes, black storks, white-tailed eagles, European honey buzzards, lesser spotted eagles. There are several protected areas in the forest: the Dovydai Forest Botanical Sanctuary, the Ilgatrakis Forest Botanical Zoological Sanctuary, the Lančiūnava Forest Botanical Sanctuary. The Lančiūnava Oak Tree grew in the forest (a nature heritage monument since 1960 but decayed around 2018).

There are Lančiūnava, Lepšynė, Užvalkiai, Rudžiai, Būdai, Milžemiai, Pagilupys, Gaisai, Grąžčiai, Lalai, Stebuliai villages inside the forest or on its edges.

Images

References

Forests of Lithuania
Kėdainiai District Municipality